Systomus immaculatus is a species of cyprinid fish endemic to the Assam region in India.  This species can reach a length of  SL.

References 

Systomus
Freshwater fish of India
Fish described in 1839